Wan Tau Tong Estate is a public housing estate in Tai Po, New Territories, Hong Kong. It is the second last public housing estate in Tai Po, but it is not built on the reclaimed land. The estate consists of 3 residential buildings completed in 1991. Some of the flats were sold to tenants through Phase 1 of the Tenants Purchase Scheme in 1998.

Yat Nga Court, Tak Nga Court and King Nga Court are Home Ownership Scheme housing courts in Tai Po near Wan Tau Tong Estate, built between 1991 and 1992.

Houses

Wan Tau Tong Estate

Yat Nga Court

Tak Nga Court

King Nga Court

Demographics
According to the 2016 by-census, Wan Tau Tong Estate had a population of 7,277 while Yat Nga Court had a population of 3,583. Altogether the population amounts to 10,860.

Politics
Wan Tau Tong Estate, Yat Nga Court, Tak Nga Court and King Nga Court are located in Wan Tau Tong constituency of the Tai Po District Council. It is currently represented by Wong Siu-kin, who was elected in the 2019 elections.

See also

Public housing estates in Tai Po

References

Residential buildings completed in 1991
Public housing estates in Hong Kong
Tenants Purchase Scheme
Tai Po
1991 establishments in Hong Kong